Vladimír Podzimek (12 May 1965 – 17 May 1994) was a Czechoslovakian ski jumper.

Career
He earned a bronze medal in the Team large hill event at the 1984 FIS Nordic World Ski Championships in Engelberg.

Podzimek's best finish at the Winter Olympics was 8th in the individual large hill at Sarajevo in 1984. He also finished 4th in the 1986 Ski-flying World Championships.

Podzimek's only individual victory came at the 1984 Holmenkollen ski festival, the only Czechoslovak ski jumper to do so.

Podzimek committed suicide by hanging on 17 May 1994.

World Cup

Standings

Wins

References

External links 

Holmenkollen winners since 1892 - click Vinnere for downloadable pdf file 

1965 births
1994 suicides
Czech male ski jumpers
Czechoslovak male ski jumpers
Ski jumpers at the 1984 Winter Olympics
Holmenkollen Ski Festival winners
FIS Nordic World Ski Championships medalists in ski jumping
Universiade medalists in ski jumping
Universiade silver medalists for Czechoslovakia
Competitors at the 1991 Winter Universiade
Suicides by hanging in the Czech Republic
People from Jilemnice
Sportspeople from the Liberec Region